The Corridor IX is one of the Pan-European corridors. It runs between Helsinki in Finland and Alexandroupolis in Greece. The corridor follows the route: Helsinki - Vyborg - Saint Petersburg - Moscow - Kyiv - Chișinău - Bucharest - Ruse - Stara Zagora - Dimitrovgrad - Alexandroupolis.

Branches
Corridor IX has 3 branches: 
Branch A - Klaipėda - Vilnius - Minsk - Gomel
Branch B - Kaliningrad - Vilnius - Minsk - Gomel
Branch C - Liubashivka - Rozdilna - Odessa

References

09
Roads in Finland
Roads in Russia
Roads in Belarus
Roads in Lithuania
Roads in Ukraine
Roads in Moldova
Roads in Romania
Roads in Bulgaria
Roads in Greece